Ghoshpara is a neighbourhood of Bally Jagachha CD block, in Howrah district in the state of West Bengal.

Ghoshpara is under the jurisdiction of Nischinda Police Station of Howrah City Police.

Some of the reputed families in this area are the Neogy, Ghosh, Dewanji, Bag, Roychowdhury, Ghatak, Chakraborty family and many more. There are two large lakes named Bnakpukur (বাঁকপুকুর) and Talpukur (তালপুকুর).

History
From the 13th century A.D, Muslim rulers took possession of Saptagram and extended their region up to Damodar during the middle of 16th century. Sultan Sulaiman Kararui conquered part of Howrah, grouped it into Sarkars and named after himself Sulaimanabad. The district appears to have been distributed between three Sarkars -Saptagram (now in Hooghly), Mandaran (now in Hooghly) and Sulaimanabad. Ghoshpara was then a part of Sulaimanabad.

Transport
The main transportation vehicles of Ghoshpara are Rickshaw and e-Rickshaw called as 'Toto'.

Market
There is a market named as "Ghoshpara Bazar" where fish, meat, vegetables and grocery items can be found at negotiable rate. The market consists of all kind of local shops including footwear, utensils, bookstore, etc.

School

Government
 Unnayani Prathamik Vidyalaya (Primary School)
 Arunodaya Prathamik Vidyalaya (Primary School)

Private
 Ghoshpara Adarsha Pathabhawan (Primary School)
 Sachindranath Sishu Niketan (Primary School)
 Sarada english medium school (Primary and mid-Secondary School)
 Patha Bhawan (Primary School)
 Euro Kids Pre-school (Play School)

Library
 Bratisangha Granthagar

Bank
 State Bank of India - Ghoshpara Branch
 Bank of Baroda (Dena Bank) - Ghoshpara Branch
 Karur Vysya Bank - Ghoshpara Branch

Healthcare
 Ghoshpara Subsidiary Health Center (Homoeopathy and Allopathy)

Religious places
 Ghoshpara Sarbojanin Durga Mandir and Shiva Temple
 Kaivalya Dham
 Chaitanya Parishad

Sport ground
 Little Group Maidan
 Palpara Football Ground

Water bodies
 Talpukur
 Bnakpukur

Post Office
 Ghoshpara Post Office

References 

Kolkata Metropolitan Area
Neighbourhoods in Kolkata
Howrah district